The Pittsburgh Canons were  an American soccer club based in Pittsburgh, Pennsylvania, that was a member of the American Soccer League during the 1972 season.

Overview
The franchise was granted by the ASL in early June 1972, and was formed largely from players on the Canonsburg Maggis club that played in the amateur Keystone Soccer League. The team's president was James T. Maggi, with Scotty Foley serving as both the coach and general manager. Not realizing that the team's roots were in the borough of Canonsburg, out-of-town newspapers frequently misspelled their nickname as the "Cannons."

Year-by-year

Final conference standings

*Chicago Americans played only a few games

Regular season results

References

External links
 The Year in American Soccer - 1972

Defunct soccer clubs in Pennsylvania
Soccer clubs in Pennsylvania
Cannons
American Soccer League (1933–1983) teams